Polycystic liver disease (PLD) usually describes the presence of multiple cysts scattered throughout normal liver tissue. PLD is commonly seen in association with autosomal-dominant polycystic kidney disease, with a prevalence of 1 in 400 to 1000, and accounts for 8–10% of all cases of end-stage renal disease. The much rarer autosomal-dominant polycystic liver disease will progress without any kidney involvement.

Presentation

Pathophysiology

Associations with PRKCSH and SEC63 have been described. Polycystic liver disease comes in two forms: autosomal dominant polycystic kidney disease (with kidney cysts) and autosomal dominant polycystic liver disease (liver cysts only).

Diagnosis
Most patients with PLD are asymptomatic with simple cysts found following routine investigations. After confirming the presence of cysts in the liver, laboratory tests may be ordered to check for liver function including bilirubin, alkaline phosphatase, alanine aminotransferase, and prothrombin time.

Patients with PLD often have an enlarged liver which will compress adjacent organs, leading to nausea, respiratory issues, and limited physical ability. Classification of the progression of the disease takes into consideration the amount of remaining liver parenchyma compared to the amount and size of cysts.

Polycystic liver disease can exist either as isolated polycystic liver disease (PCLD), part of autosomal dominant polycystic kidney disease (ADPKD), or autosomal recessive polycystic kidney disease (ARPKD).

Treatment
Many patients are asymptomatic and thus are not candidates for surgery. For patients with pain or complications from the cysts, the goal of treatment is to reduce the size of cysts while protecting the functioning liver parenchyma.

Cysts may be removed surgically or by using aspiration sclerotherapy.

References

Further reading

External links 

Deficiencies of intracellular signaling peptides and proteins
Diseases of liver